The iliolumbar vein is the vena comitans of the iliolumbar artery.

The obturator nerve crosses superficial to it.

A single vein is found more commonly than a double vein.

It drains vertebral segments four and five.

It is closely related to the ascending lumbar vein.

References

External links

Veins of the torso